Chur Kuchan (also Romanized as Chūr Kūchān and Chever Kūchān; also known as Chever Kūkhān) is a village in Kurka Rural District, in the Central District of Astaneh-ye Ashrafiyeh County, Gilan Province, Iran. At the 2006 census, its population was 1,586, in 428 families.

References 

Populated places in Astaneh-ye Ashrafiyeh County